The 2017 Kremlin Cup was a professional ten-ball pool tournament held from 18–23 September 2017 in Olympic Stadium in Moscow, Russia.

The winner was David Alcaide, who defeated the defending champion in the final Alexander Kazakis 9–6. Nick van den Berg and Eklent Kaçi were defeated semi-finalists.

Tournament format 
The event featured 101 participants competing first in a Double-elimination tournament. When there are 32 players remaining, the tournament progressed to a single-elimination tournament. The event was played as winner breaks.

Prize money

Results
Below is the single elimination round from the last 32 stage onwards.

References

External links

2017 in cue sports
Kremlin Cup (pool)